Evans-Gaige-Dillenback House is a historic home located at Lyme in Jefferson County, New York. It was built in 1820 and consists of a -story three-by-four-bay main block, with a -story three-by-four-bay anterior wing, both of limestone in the Federal style.  Attached is a -story, two-bay square rear wing and attached to it is a modern frame two car garage.  Also on the property is a stone smoke house.

It was listed on the National Register of Historic Places in 1990.

References

Houses on the National Register of Historic Places in New York (state)
Georgian architecture in New York (state)
Federal architecture in New York (state)
Houses completed in 1820
Houses in Jefferson County, New York
National Register of Historic Places in Jefferson County, New York